George Albert II, Count of Erbach-Fürstenau (26 February 1648 – 23 March 1717), was a member of the German House of Erbach who held the fiefs of Fürstenau, Schönberg, Seeheim, Reichenberg and Breuberg.

Born in Fürstenau, he was the ninth child and sixth (but fourth surviving) son of George Albert I, Count of Erbach-Schönberg and his third wife Elisabeth Dorothea, a daughter of George Frederick II, Count of Hohenlohe-Waldenburg in Schillingsfürst. He was born three months after his father's death, on 25 November 1647.

Life

He pursued a military career and became an Oberstleutnant of the Imperial army.

Following the division of the Erbach patrimony in 1672, George Albert II received the districts of Schönberg, Seeheim and 1/4 of Breuberg; in 1678, following the death of his brother George IV, he added to his domains the districts of Fürstenau and Reichenberg.

George Albert II died in Fürstenau aged 69 and was buried in Michelstadt.

Notes

Counts of Germany
House of Erbach
1648 births
1717 deaths
18th-century German people